Gösta Rudolf Torsten "Lill-Lulle" Johansson (2 March 1929 – 10 April 1997) was a Swedish ice hockey player and son of Gustaf ”Lulle” Johansson.
 
In 1953 Johansson became world champion with the Swedish team. He was named one of the best players of 1949–1955 among Sven Tumba, Roland Stoltz and Lasse Björn. He was 32nd winner of “Stor Grabb” (Big Boy), an honorary award within Swedish sports. In 1952 Johansson finished third with the Swedish team in the Winter Olympics ice hockey tournament. He also won silver in 1951 and bronze in 1954 in the World Ice Hockey Championships. As a player of Djurgårdens IF, Johansson was Swedish champion a total of seven times.

Johansson was the first Swedish ice hockey player to play professionally. He won the German championship as a player of Krefeld in former Federal Republic of Germany. Besides working as a businessman, Johansson was a successful trainer in Sweden, Switzerland and Italy. He coached the team Bolzano to 3 times championship victory.

He became the second highest ranked Swedish ice hockey professional in Europe. He played in Zurich-Switzerland, and Krefeld in Germany during the 1950–1951 season.

After finishing his active career, Johansson worked as an ice hockey coach. He was also a businessman in Sweden, Switzerland and Italy. Johansson won the Italian championship three times. In 1955 he married the German skater Gundi Busch. She was Germany’s first VM-championship in ice skating, which she won in 1954. Later they moved to Stockholm with their son Peter Lulle Johansson. In Stockholm, Gundi worked as ice skating trainer for many years before she died in Chronic obstructive pulmonary disease 2014.

Gösta ”Lill-Lulle” Johansson died from liver cancer at home in Stockholm in 1997.

References

External links 
 

1929 births
1997 deaths
Djurgårdens IF Hockey players
Ice hockey players at the 1952 Winter Olympics
Medalists at the 1952 Winter Olympics
Olympic bronze medalists for Sweden
Olympic ice hockey players of Sweden
Olympic medalists in ice hockey
Deaths from cancer in Sweden
Deaths from liver cancer
Ice hockey people from Stockholm